The Cathedral of St. Sebastian, also called Ilhéus Cathedral, located in the historic center of Ilhéus, Bahia in Brazil, is the Roman Catholic cathedral of the Diocese of Ilhéus. It is under the pastoral responsibility of bishop Mauro Montagnoli.

The cathedral was built in the neoclassical style., the structure is one of the key tourist attractions in town. It has a dome that reaches 47 meters in height, which took another 30 years to be built, finally inaugurated in 1967.

It has served as the mother church for the diocese since its erection in 1913 by Pope Pius X with the bull "Majus animarum bonum."

See also
Roman Catholicism in Brazil
St. Sebastian

References

Roman Catholic cathedrals in Bahia
Ilhéus
1913 establishments in Brazil
20th-century Roman Catholic church buildings in Brazil
Historic Center (Salvador, Bahia)
Roman Catholic churches completed in 1967
Church buildings with domes